The 2017 St. Paul Cash Spiel was held from October 6 to 8  at the St. Paul Curling Club in St. Paul, Minnesota as part of the 2017–18 World Curling Tour. Both the men's and women's event were held in a round robin format.

Men

Teams
The teams are listed as follows:

Round-robin standings

Playoffs

Women

Teams

The teams are listed as follows:

Round-robin standings

Playoffs

References

External links

St. Paul Cash Spiel
Curling in Minnesota
Sports competitions in Saint Paul, Minnesota
St. Paul Cash Spiel
St. Paul Cash Spiel
21st century in Saint Paul, Minnesota